Nepenthes gracillima (from the Latin superlative of gracilis "slender") is a highland Nepenthes pitcher plant species, native to Peninsular Malaysia.

Infraspecific taxa

Nepenthes gracillima f. ramispina (Ridl.) Hort.Westphal (2000) [=N. ramispina]
Nepenthes gracillima var. maior Ridl. (1924)

References

Further reading

 Bauer, U., C.J. Clemente, T. Renner & W. Federle 2012. Form follows function: morphological diversification and alternative trapping strategies in carnivorous Nepenthes pitcher plants. Journal of Evolutionary Biology 25(1): 90–102. 
 Clarke, C.M. 2006. Introduction. In: Danser, B.H. The Nepenthaceae of the Netherlands Indies. Natural History Publications (Borneo), Kota Kinabalu. pp. 1–15.
 Kurup, R., A.J. Johnson, S. Sankar, A.A. Hussain, C.S. Kumar & S. Baby 2013. Fluorescent prey traps in carnivorous plants. Plant Biology 15(3): 611–615. 
 Macfarlane, J.M. 1914. Family XCVI. Nepenthaceæ. [pp. 279–288] In: J.S. Gamble. Materials for a flora of the Malayan Peninsula, No. 24. Journal & Proceedings of the Asiatic Society of Bengal 75(3): 279–391.
  Mansur, M. 2001.  In: Prosiding Seminar Hari Cinta Puspa dan Satwa Nasional. Lembaga Ilmu Pengetahuan Indonesia, Bogor. pp. 244–253.
 McPherson, S. 2009. Nepenthes alba and Nepenthes gracillima. Carnivorous Plant Newsletter 38(4): 102–106.
 McPherson, S.R. & A. Robinson 2012. Field Guide to the Pitcher Plants of Peninsular Malaysia and Indochina. Redfern Natural History Productions, Poole.
  Meimberg, H. 2002.  Ph.D. thesis, Ludwig Maximilian University of Munich, Munich.
 Meimberg, H. & G. Heubl 2006. Introduction of a nuclear marker for phylogenetic analysis of Nepenthaceae. Plant Biology 8(6): 831–840. 
 Meimberg, H., S. Thalhammer, A. Brachmann & G. Heubl 2006. Comparative analysis of a translocated copy of the trnK intron in carnivorous family Nepenthaceae. Molecular Phylogenetics and Evolution 39(2): 478–490. 
 Renner, T. & C.D. Specht 2011. A sticky situation: assessing adaptations for plant carnivory in the Caryophyllales by means of stochastic character mapping. International Journal of Plant Sciences 172(7): 889–901. 
 Ridley, H.N. 1909. Nepenthaceæ. [p. 59] In: The flora of the Telôm and Batang Padang valleys. Journal of the Federated Malay States Museums 4(1): 1–98.
 Ridley, H.N. 1915. Nepenthaceæ. [p. 11] In: I. An expedition to Mount Menuang Gasing, Selangor. Journal of the Federated Malay States Museums 6: 1–21.
 Ridley, H.N. 1915. Nepenthaceæ. [pp. 168–169] In: XIII. The botany of Gunong Tahan, Pahang. Journal of the Federated Malay States Museums 6: 127–202.
 Shivas, R.G. 1983.   Carnivorous Plant Newsletter 12(3): 65–67.
 Thorogood, C. 2010. The Malaysian Nepenthes: Evolutionary and Taxonomic Perspectives. Nova Science Publishers, New York.

External links
 Nepenthes alba and Nepenthes gracillima by Stewart McPherson

Carnivorous plants of Asia
gracillima
Endemic flora of Peninsular Malaysia
Plants described in 1908